The Clipperton angelfish (Holacanthus limbaughi) is a species of marine ray-finned fish, a marine angelfish belonging to the family Pomacanthidae. It is endemic to Clipperton Island, a French possession in the eastern Pacific Ocean.

Description
The Clipperton angelfish has a deep, laterally compressed body. It has a small mouth that has bristle-like teeth. The preoperculum has a sizeable spine at its corner and a serrated rear margin while there are 4 spines between the preoperculum and the operculum. The juveniles are a dark bluish-grey on their bodies, which is marked with a number of vertical blue bars, 2 on the head and 5 on the flanks, these fade as they mature into adults. They also have a white spot on the upper side and white caudal and pectoral fins. The adults are similar, lacking the barring, and have vivid blue margins to the dorsal, anal and pelvic fins. The dorsal fin contains 14 spines and 17-18 soft rays while the anal fin has 3 spines and 17-18 soft rays.

Distribution

Habitat and biology
Very little is known about its habitat preferences and biology.

Systematics
The Clipperton angelfish was first formally described in 1963 by the American ichthyologist Wayne J. Baldwin. The specific name honours the American scuba diver, zoologist and underwater photographer Conrad Limbaugh (1925-1960) who played a vital role in the collection of the type.

Utilisation
The Clipperton angelfish has such a remote and restricted distribution that it is extremely scarce in the aquarium trade. When it has appeared in that trade it has commanded very high prices.

References

Clipperton angelfish
Fish described in 1963
Fauna of Clipperton Island